The 2011 Towson Tigers football team represented Towson University in the 2011 NCAA Division I FCS football season. The Tigers were led by third-year head coach Rob Ambrose and played their home games at Johnny Unitas Stadium. They are a member of the Colonial Athletic Association (CAA). They finished the season 9–3, 7–1 in CAA play to win the conference championship. They received the CAA's automatic bid into the FCS playoffs where they lost in the second round to Lehigh.

Schedule

References

Towson
Towson Tigers football seasons
Colonial Athletic Association football champion seasons
Towson
Towson Tigers football